The Electoral district of Clayton is a former electoral district of the Victorian Legislative Assembly. It was named for the Melbourne suburb of Clayton, and also includes Clarinda, Notting Hill as well as parts of surrounding suburbs.

It was created by the redistribution that abolished malapportionment in the Victorian Legislative Assembly prior to the 1985 election, and was always a safe Labor seat. Clayton was abolished in 2014 following a redistribution of Victoria's electoral boundaries. Much of Clayton's territory is in the new district of Clarinda.

Members for Clayton

Election results

See also
 Parliaments of the Australian states and territories
 List of members of the Victorian Legislative Assembly

References

External links
 Electorate profile: Clayton District, Victorian Electoral Commission

1985 establishments in Australia
2014 disestablishments in Australia
Former electoral districts of Victoria (Australia)